Declan Carr (born 30 July 1965) is an Irish retired hurler who played as a midfielder for the Tipperary senior team.

Carr joined the team during the 1988-89 National League and was a regular member of the starting fifteen until he quit the panel after the 1993-94 National League. He made a brief return for the 1999 championship. During that time he won two All-Ireland medals, three Munster medals, one National League medal and one All-Star award. Carr captained the team to the All-Ireland title in 1991.

At club level Carr is a one-time county club championship medalist with Holycross–Ballycahill.

He has also managed the Holycross-Ballycahill senior team and the Tipperary U-21 team.

Early life

Declan Carr was born in Dublin in 1965.  He was educated locally and in 1980 he moved to Ballycahill in County Tipperary.  While Carr went on to play hurling for Tipperary, his brother, Tommy Carr, later played football for Dublin.

Playing career

Club

Carr played his club hurling with Holycross–Ballycahill.  He won a senior county championship with the club in 1990.

Inter-county

Carr's hurling skills were quickly spotted by the inter-county selectors and he soon joined the Tipperary under-21 team in the mid-1980s.  From here he moved onto the senior panel, playing in the National Hurling League campaign of 1988–1989.  That year he made his senior championship debut before later collecting his first All-Ireland medal following a final win over Antrim.  At the end of the year Carr was presented with an All-Star award.

Two years later in 1991 Carr was appointed captain of the Tipperary team.
That year he won his first Munster medal as a full member of the Tipperary team, before later winning his second All-Ireland medal following a win over Kilkenny.

In 1994 Carr decided to leave Ireland, moving to the United States, before returning again in 1998. He regained his place on the Tipperary team, winning a National Hurling League medal in 1999.  He retired from inter-county hurling panel in 1999.

Coaching career
In January 2021, Carr was appointed manager of the Tipperary ladies football team.

Honours

Tipperary 

All-Ireland Senior Hurling Championship:
Winner (2): 1989, 1991 (c)
Munster Senior Hurling Championship:
Winner (3): 1989, 1991, 1993
National Hurling League:
Winner (1): 1999

References

External links
Tipperary Senior Hurling Record

 

1965 births
Living people
All-Ireland Senior Hurling Championship winners
Holycross-Ballycahill hurlers
Ladies' Gaelic football managers
Munster inter-provincial hurlers
Tipperary inter-county hurlers